Euhippe was a town of ancient Caria, inhabited during Hellenistic and Roman times. 

Its site is located near Dalama in Asiatic Turkey.

References

Populated places in ancient Caria
Former populated places in Turkey
Roman towns and cities in Turkey
History of Aydın Province
Efeler District